Veymandoo (Dhivehi: ވޭމަންޑޫ) is the capital of Thaa Atoll in the Maldives.

Geography

Demography

References

External links
Kinbidhoo News

Populated places in the Maldives
Islands of the Maldives